Alan Gustavo Ramírez Gómez (born November 23, 1989, in Guadalajara, Jalisco) is a former Mexican professional footballer who last played for Loros UdeC.

References

1989 births
Living people
Mexican footballers
Loros UdeC footballers
Ascenso MX players
Liga Premier de México players
Footballers from Guadalajara, Jalisco
Association footballers not categorized by position